(meaning "watchmaking manufacturer") is a French language term of horology that has also been adopted in the English language as a loanword. In horology, the term is usually encountered in its abbreviated form manufacture. This term is used when describing a wrist watch movement or watchworks fabricator which makes all or most of the parts required for its products in its own production facilities, as opposed to simply assembling watches using parts purchased from other firms.

Definition
The Dictionnaire professionnel illustree de l'horlogerie (The Illustrated Professional Dictionary of the Watchmaking Industry) defines manufacture as follows: 
In the Swiss watch industry the term manufacture is used of a factory in which watches are manufactured almost completely, as distinct from an atelier de terminage, which is concerned only with assembling, timing, fitting the hands and casing.

The concept of manufacture in the Swiss watch making industry refers to any firm that at least designs calibres, produces the movements parts thereof called ébauches, and assembles them into watches. For example, a company that does not manufacture crystals (the watch glass) or hairsprings may still be regarded as a manufacture.

Examples
The following companies produce whole watches, including cases and movements:
 A. Lange & Söhne
 Aquastar (watch brand)
 Audemars Piguet
 Blancpain
 Breguet
 Breitling SA
 Bvlgari
 Cartier (some models)
 Chopard
 Citizen Watch
 Damasko (some models)
 Frédérique Constant  (some models)
 F. P. Journe
 Gallet & Co.
 Girard-Perregaux
 Glashutte Original
 Moritz Grossman
H. Moser & Cie
Hamilton
 Hublot
 IWC
 Jaeger-LeCoultre
 Jaquet Droz
 Lang & Heyne
 Maurice Lacroix
 Omega SA
 Orient 
 Panerai
 Parmigiani Fleurier
 Patek Philippe & Co.
 Piaget SA
 Roger Dubuis
 Rolex
 Seagull
 Seiko
 The Swatch Group
 Tudor
 Ulysse Nardin
 Vacheron Constantin
 Vostok
 Vulcain Watches
 Zenith

See also
Federation of the Swiss Watch Industry
Ébauche
ETA SA

References

French words and phrases
Watches
Horology
Economy of Switzerland